Sir Thomas Gorges (1536 – 30 March 1610) of Longford Castle in Wiltshire, was a courtier and Groom of the Chamber to Queen Elizabeth I. Via his great-grandmother Lady Anne Howard, a daughter of John Howard, 1st Duke of Norfolk, he was a second cousin of both Queens Anne Boleyn and Catherine Howard, the second and fifth wives of King Henry VIII. In 1586 he was elected as a Member of Parliament for Downton in Wiltshire.

Origins
He was born in Wraxall, Somerset, the son of Sir Edward Gorges of Wraxall, by either his first or second wife, namely Mary Newton or Mary Poyntz (sister of Nicholas Poyntz (d.1557)), respectively. His nephew was the poet and translator Arthur Gorges. He was descended in the male line from Sir John Russell (died c. 1224) of Kingston Russell in Dorset, a household knight of King John (1199–1216). Ralph Gorges, 2nd Baron Gorges (d.1330/1), who died without issue, was keen to see his family name and armorials continue, and formed the plan of bequeathing the Gorges estates to a younger son of his sister Eleanor Gorges (by her husband Theobald Russell I (1303–1340) of Kingston Russell) on condition that he should adopt the name and arms of Gorges. Eleanor's third son, Theobald Russell II, accordingly adopted the surname Gorges and founded a revived Gorges line, which flourished, based at Wraxall, Somerset.

Career
Gorges was serving as Governor of Hurst Castle in Hampshire when, during the Spanish Armada of 1588, one of the Spanish treasure ships laden with silver was driven aground nearby. Lady Gorges was granted ownership of the wreck by Queen Elizabeth I, following her request.

He was knighted at Beddington in 1586. During the reign of James I, Gorges and his wife were granted the offices of Keeper of the Palace of West Sheen (Richmond Palace in Surrey), Keeper of the Wardrobe (responsible for the vessels and provisions there), and Keeper of the Gardens and of Richmond Park. By letters patent under the Privy Seal, Lady Gorges was granted an annual allowance of £245 5s.

Marriage and issue
In 1576 he married Helena Snakenborg, dowager Marchioness of Northampton, the widow of William Parr, 1st Marquess of Northampton (1513–1571), KG, the only brother of Queen Catherine Parr, the sixth and final wife and widow of Henry VIII. Parr died without issue. She was a daughter of Ulf Henrikson von Snakenborg of Ostergottland, Sweden. She was First Lady of the Privy Chamber to Elizabeth I, and had come to England from Sweden in 1565 in the train of Cecilia, Margravine of Baden. By his wife he had issue including:

Sons
Francis Gorges (c.1579-1599), eldest son, who predeceased his father
Edward Gorges, 1st Baron Gorges (1582/3–1652) of Dundalk
Sir Theobald Gorges (1583–1647), Member of Parliament
Robert Gorges (c.1589–1648), of Redlynch, Somerset, a Member of Parliament; the daughter and heiress of his grandson Poyntz Gorges was Agnes Gorges, heiress of Redlynch, who married her cousin Robert Phelips MP.
Thomas Gorges (1589–post 1624).

Daughters
Elizabeth Gorges (1578–1659), who married firstly Sir Hugh Smythe of Long Ashton in Somerset and secondly on 28 Sep 1629 to her relative the colonial entrepreneur Sir Ferdinando Gorges
Frances Gorges (1580–1649), who in about 1610 married Thomas Tyringham of Little Langford, Wiltshire
Bridget Gorges (1584-c1634), who married Sir Robert Phelips MP.

Longford Castle
In 1573 Gorges acquired the manor of Langford (now Longford Castle) in Wiltshire. With the artistic direction of his wife he built the surviving Longford Castle on the banks of the River Avon, to the south of the city of Salisbury, a triangular Swedish pattern castle with a round tower in each corner, with deer park, fruit garden and kitchen garden.

Death, burial and monument

He was buried in Salisbury Cathedral, where survives (at the east end of the north choir aisle, on the north side of the Lady Chapel) his magnificent monument with recumbent effigies of himself and his wife, erected in 1635 by his son Edward Gorges, 1st Baron Gorges, after the death of his widow. The sides of the elaborate canopy above the effigies, supported on four Solomonic columns, display sculpted framework polyhedra, including two cuboctahedra and an icosahedron, and the canopy is topped by a celestial globe surmounted by a dodecahedron. These devices are possibly a reference to Leonardo da Vinci's drawings for Luca Pacioli (Divina Proportione, Paganini, Venice, 1509), ultimately based on Plato's Timaeus in which each of the regular polyhedra (or five regular solids) are assigned to the atomic structure of one of the five elements, with the dodecahedron representing the whole celestial sphere. Similar Platonic geometric symbolism survives on the contemporary monument to Sir Anthony Ashley (1551–1627/8, Clerk to the Privy Council) at nearby Wimborne St Giles, erected by his son-in-law Anthony Ashley-Cooper, 1st Earl of Shaftesbury (1621–1683). "All the known examples of these polyhedral sculptures originate within a period of about 30 years, during which England and the rest of Europe saw a resurgence of interest in quasi-mystical geometric symbolism". The design possibly refers to the science of navigation, in which both commemorated men were proficient.

References

Further reading 
"W.J.J.", biography of Gorges, Thomas (1536-1610), of Longford, Wilts., published in History of Parliament: the House of Commons 1558–1603, ed. P.W. Hasler, 1981 
Gorges, Raymond & Brown, Frederick, The Story of a Family through Eleven Centuries, Illustrated by Portraits and Pedigrees: Being a History of the Family of Gorges, 1944
James Michael John Fletcher & Thomas Gorges, The Gorges Monument in Salisbury Cathedral, 1932

English knights
1536 births
1610 deaths
Thomas
People from North Somerset (district)
16th-century English people
17th-century English people
Burials at Salisbury Cathedral